Hermann Hummels (born 29 September 1959) is a German former football player and manager who played as a midfielder.

He is the father of Jonas and Mats Hummels.

References

1959 births
Living people
German footballers
Association football midfielders
Hammer SpVg players
SC Paderborn 07 players
2. Bundesliga players
German football managers
SV Wehen Wiesbaden managers
1. FSV Mainz 05 managers
FC Bayern Munich non-playing staff
Sportspeople from Hamm
Footballers from North Rhine-Westphalia